Charles Grant Heasley House is a historic home located at Franklin Township in Greene County, Pennsylvania. It was built between 1903 and 1905, and is a three-story, square brick building with a slate covered hipped roof.  It measures approximately 42 feet by 42 feet, and sits on a stone foundation.  The roofline features four chimneys, four spires, a pinnacle with finial, and six dormers. The house is representative of the Châteauesque style.

It was listed on the National Register of Historic Places in 1991.

References 

Houses on the National Register of Historic Places in Pennsylvania
Houses completed in 1905
Houses in Greene County, Pennsylvania
National Register of Historic Places in Greene County, Pennsylvania
1905 establishments in Pennsylvania